Giulio Sansedoni (28 March 1551 – 19 December 1625) was a Roman Catholic prelate who served as Bishop of Grosseto (1606–1611).

Biography
Giulio Sansedoni was born on 28 March 1551 in Siena, Italy and ordained a priest on 15 Jun 1577.
On 20 November 1606, he was appointed during the papacy of Pope Paul V as Bishop of Grosseto. 
On 26 November 1606, he was consecrated bishop by Girolamo Bernerio, Cardinal-Bishop of Albano, with Paolo Alberi, Archbishop Emeritus of Dubrovnik, and Metello Bichi, Bishop Emeritus of Sovana, serving as co-consecrators. 
He served as Bishop of Grosseto until his resignation in 1611.

Episcopal succession
While bishop, he was the principal co-consecrator of:

References

External links and additional sources
 (for Chronology of Bishops) 
 (for Chronology of Bishops)  

17th-century Italian Roman Catholic bishops
Bishops appointed by Pope Paul V
Bishops of Grosseto
1551 births
1625 deaths
People from Siena